The 2014 NASCAR Whelen Southern Modified Tour was the 12th season of the NASCAR Whelen Southern Modified Tour (WSMT). It began with the UNOH Battle at the Beach at Daytona International Speedway on February 18, which did not count towards the championship. The first race for the championship was the Whelen Season Opener 150 at Caraway Speedway on March 9. It ended with the Southern Slam 150 at Charlotte Motor Speedway on October 9. George Brunnhoelzl III entered the season as the defending Drivers' Champion.

A previous two-time series runner-up, Andy Seuss won his first championship title, after a fifth-place finish at the final race in Charlotte. Seuss, who won a trio of races in the opening half of the season – two at Caraway Speedway and one at South Boston Speedway – finished 14 points clear of Brunnhoelzl III, who won a pair of races at Langley Speedway and also at Caraway Speedway. Third place in the championship went to Burt Myers, who won the most races during the season, with four, all of which came during the second half of the season. Aside from the lead trio, other drivers to take race victories were J. R. Bertuccio, who won at Southern National Motorsports Park, Danny Bohn was a winner at Bowman Gray Stadium and Kyle Ebersole won the season's second race at South Boston Speedway. A combination race was also held during the season, the Bush's Beans 150 at Bristol Motor Speedway, with competitors from the Whelen Southern Modified Tour competing along with competitors for the Whelen Modified Tour. The race was won by Tommy Barrett Jr. and the best Southern Modified Tour competitor was Bertuccio in 13th position.

Drivers

Notes

Schedule

The UNOH Battle at the Beach did not count towards the championship.

Notes
1 – The Prestoria Farms 150 was originally scheduled for March 29, but was postponed to October 4 due to heavy rain.
The Bunny Hop 150 was originally scheduled to be held at Caraway Speedway on April 19, but was postponed due to heavy rain. On May 7, it was announced that the race would not be rescheduled.

Results and standings

Races

Drivers' championship

(key) Bold - Pole position awarded by time. Italics - Pole position set by final practice results or rainout. * – Most laps led.

Notes
‡ – Non-championship round
1 – Scored points towards the Whelen Modified Tour.
2 – Joe Ryan Osborne, Thomas Stinson and Brandon Ward received championship points, despite the fact that they did not start the race.

See also

2014 NASCAR Sprint Cup Series
2014 NASCAR Nationwide Series
2014 NASCAR Camping World Truck Series
2014 NASCAR K&N Pro Series East
2014 NASCAR K&N Pro Series West
2014 NASCAR Whelen Modified Tour
2014 NASCAR Canadian Tire Series
2014 NASCAR Toyota Series
2014 NASCAR Whelen Euro Series

References